The Army Gold Medal (1808–1814), also known as the Peninsular Gold Medal, with an accompanying Gold Cross, was a British campaign medal awarded in recognition of field and general officers' successful commands in campaigns, predominantly the Peninsular War.  It was not a general medal, since it was issued only to officers whose status was no less than that of battalion commander or equivalent.

Background
Naval Gold Medals had been awarded since 1794 to captains and admirals who had served in specified successful naval actions, admirals' medals being larger. In 1806 a special gold medal was presented to British Army majors and above who had taken a key part in the Battle of Maida. This medal,  in diameter, shows the profile of King George III on the obverse with a reverse design incorporating Britannia and the Sicilian triskeles.

A general campaign medal for the Napoleonic Wars, awarded to all British troops irrespective of rank, would only be established in 1847.

Awards
The Army Gold Medal was established in 1810 to reward service at Napoleonic War battles since 1808. Like the Maida Gold Medal, it was awarded only to majors and above and, like the Naval Gold Medal, it was awarded in two sizes, with the larger to senior officers.

When the Army Gold Medal was first established, a new one was issued for each action. In October 1813, to prevent a proliferation of awards to one recipient, an order was created instructing that only one medal be worn, with a ribbon clasp denoting the battle concerned for any further award. The fourth award was to be marked by a Gold Cross, replacing the earlier medals, with the names of each of the four battles on the arms of the cross. Again, clasps for attachment to the ribbon of the cross were presented for any successive awards.

The award could be awarded posthumously, and sent to the officer's family.

The total number awarded were:

The highest award was earned by the Duke of Wellington: a Cross with nine bars for a total of 13 actions. It can be viewed on his uniform in the basement at Apsley House.

Appearance
The medal came in three styles, laid out below:

Behind her, the head of a lion can be seen.Reverse: A laurel wreath surround, with the name of the battle engraved in the centre, although that for Barrosa was die struck.The medal was worn around the neck.The designer was Thomas Wyon

The Gold (or Peninsular) Cross was awarded to those who earned four or more gold medals, which it replaced. The obverse and reverse are the same. Any further actions were marked with a clasp.The medal was worn around the neck with the ribbon attached via an ornate loop on top of the cross which passes through a smaller simpler ring below a straight suspender.The designer was Thomas Wyon.

The Clasps were of a common pattern for all awards, with the name of the battle within a wide laurel wreath frame.

This ribbon design had been used for the Maida Gold Medal and would later be used for the Waterloo and the Military General Service Medals and the Distinguished Service Order.

Naming. All awards had the name of the recipient engraved on the rim.

A Gold Collar and Cross was awarded to Duke of Wellington and to Viscount Beresford. This cross was of a similar design to the Army Gold Cross, but with a winged figure of Victory at its centre, with suspension from a chain of alternate lions and Union Flag oval medallions. The Gold Collar and Cross was a separate and additional award to the Army Gold Cross.

Discontinuation
Following the Peninsular War, award of the gold medals and Crosses was discontinued when would-be recipients became eligible for Order of the Bath on its restructuring to three classes.

In 1847 the Military General Service Medal (MGSM) was authorised, to be retrospectively awarded to all surviving veterans of the campaigns, irrespective of rank.  Holders of the gold medals, crosses or additional clasps were not eligible to claim identical clasps on the MGSM.  The eligible battles and campaigns for the MGSM were identical, with the addition of Egypt.

The design of the cross is very similar to the later Victoria Cross and is considered to have provided the inspiration.

Clasps
Awards, both medals and clasps, were made for the following 27 battles and campaigns:

 Roleia
 Vimiera
 Sahagun
 Benevente
 Sahagun and Benevente (If present at both actions)
 Corunna
 Martinique
 Talavera
 Guadaloupe
 Busaco
 Barrosa
 Fuentes D'Onor
 Albuhera
 Java
 Ciudad Rodrigo
 Badajoz
 Salamanca
 Fort Detroit
 Chateauguay
 Chrysler's Farm
 Vittoria
 Pyrenees
 St Sebastien
 Nivelle
 Nive
 Orthes
 Toulouse

The Battle of Maida in 1806 was commemorated by a gold medal of different design.

See also
 :Category:Recipients of the Army Gold Cross
 :Category:Recipients of the Army Gold Medal

Notes

References
 Dorling, H. Taprell, (1956), Ribbons and Medals, A. H. Baldwin & Son

 Joslin, Litherland and Simpkin (eds), (1988), British Battles and Medals, Spink 

 Mussell, J (ed), (2015), Medals Yearbook 2015, Token Publishing.

External links
British Medals: Army Gold Medal
British Medals: Army Gold Cross

British campaign medals
British military medals of the Napoleonic Wars
1810 introductions